Ezekiel 8 is the eighth chapter of the Book of Ezekiel in the Hebrew Bible or the Old Testament of the Christian Bible. This book contains the prophecies attributed to the prophet/priest Ezekiel, and is one of the Books of the Prophets. In this chapter, Ezekiel condemns the idolatry which he sees in the Jerusalem Temple.

Text
The original text was written in the Hebrew language. This chapter is divided into 18 verses.

Surviving early manuscripts
Some early manuscripts containing the text of this chapter in Hebrew are of the Masoretic Text tradition, which includes the Codex Cairensis (895), the Petersburg Codex of the Prophets (916), Aleppo Codex (10th century), Codex Leningradensis (1008).

There is also a translation into Koine Greek known as the Septuagint, made in the last few centuries BC. Extant ancient manuscripts of the Septuagint version include Codex Vaticanus (B; B; 4th century), Codex Alexandrinus (A; A; 5th century) and Codex Marchalianus (Q; Q; 6th century).

Verse 1
 And it came to pass in the sixth year, in the sixth month, on the fifth day of the month,
 as I sat in my house with the elders of Judah sitting before me,
 that the hand of the Lord God fell upon me there.
 "In the sixth year, in the sixth month, on the fifth day of the month": According to the New Oxford Annotated Bible, this day falls on September 17, 592 BCE; this is also the result of calculations by German theologian Bernhard Lang.

Ezekiel is depicted sitting in his own house, with the elders of Judah seated before him.

Verse 14

 So He brought me to the door of the north gate of the Lord’s house;
 and to my dismay,
 women were sitting there weeping for Tammuz. (NKJV)
"Weeping for Tammuz": an "ancient ritual of Sumerian origin," "counterpart of Sumerian Dumuzi, the fertility-god associated with shepherding and vegetation". The weeping is to commemorate the death of seasonal fertility, and the cult stresses for the mourning aspect of it. The Phoenicians called it "Adon" (or "Lord"), from where the Greek cult "Adonis" took root. The cult of Ishtar and Tammuz may have been introduced to the Kingdom of Judah during the reign of King Manasseh and the Old Testament contains numerous allusions to them. Ezekiel's testimony is the only direct mention of Tammuz in the Hebrew Bible, but the cult of Tammuz may also be alluded to in :"Because thou hast forgotten the God of thy salvation, and hast not been mindful of the rock of thy strength, therefore shalt thou plant pleasant plants, and shalt set it with strange slips: In the day shalt thou make thy plant to grow, and in the morning shalt thou make thy seed to flourish: but the harvest shall be a heap in the day of grief and of desperate sorrow." This passage may be describing the miniature gardens that women would plant in honor of Tammuz during his festival. Another possible allusion to Tammuz occurs in : "Neither shall he regard the God of his fathers, nor the desire of women, nor regard any god: for he shall magnify himself above all." The subject of this passage is Antiochus IV Epiphanes and some scholars have interpreted the reference to the "one desired by women" in this passage as an indication that Antiochus may have persecuted the cult of Tammuz. There is no external evidence to support this reading, however, and it is much more probable that this epithet is merely a jibe at Antiochus's notorious cruelty towards all the women who fell in love with him.

Verse 16
 So He brought me into the inner court of the Lord’s house; and there, at the door of the temple of the Lord, between the porch and the altar, were about twenty-five men with their backs toward the temple of the Lord and their faces toward the east, and they were worshiping the sun toward the east. (NKJV)

See also
 Jaazaniah the son of Shaphan
 Son of man
 Tammuz
Related Bible parts: Joel 2, Luke 11, 2 Corinthians 12

Notes

References

Sources

External links

Jewish
Ezekiel 8 Hebrew with Parallel English
Ezekiel 8 Hebrew with Rashi's Commentary

08